Omphalissa is an unaccepted subgenus of genus Hippeastrum, within the family Amaryllidaceae. Originally described by Richard Anthony Salisbury in 1866.

Description 
Robust habit, two to four large flowers. Perianth with a short tube(< 4 cm), paraperigonium curved closing the throat by a distinct neck. Stigma trifid or capitate, lobes > 2 mm. Spathe slit to the base. Ribbon-like leaves, 2.5 to 5 cm broad. Many dry, flat seeds.

Taxonomy 
Salisbury originally described the Omphalissa as a subgroup of the Zephyrantheae, then a tribe within the Amaryllidaceae, in which he included Amaryllis (now Hippeastrum) aulica and A. calyptrata. This was subsequently more formally defined by John Gilbert Baker in 1888, as a subgenus of Hippeastrum with six species. Baker's six species were;
 Hippeastrum aulicum
 Hippeastrum organense (now Hippeastrum correiense)
 Hippeastrum psittacinum
 Hippeastrum calyptratum
 Hippeastrum cybister
 Hippeastrum pardinum

Other selected species of Hippeastrum 
Hippeastrum bukasovii
Hippeastrum hugoi
Hippeastrum intiflorum
Hippeastrum miniatum
Hippeastrum morelianum
Hippeastrum iguazuanum

Ecology 
Contains the epiphytic species of Hippeastrum.

References 

Amaryllidoideae
Flora of South America
Hippeastrum
Garden plants of South America
Plant subgenera